The Insider is a novel by Christopher Evans published in 1981.

Plot summary
The Insider is a novel in which aging author Blair is controlled by an alien mind.

Reception
Dave Langford reviewed The Insider for White Dwarf #43, and stated that "More chilling than any number of lurching, blood-spattered vampires, Evan's low-key tensions and domestic concealments make you feel that this lurking mind – always play-acting for fear of exposing its real personality to an unsympathetic world – could almost be your own. Isn't this play-acting what we all do? The ending is sad but satisfying; The Insider is recommended."

Reviews
Review by Ian Watson (1982) in Foundation, #25 June 1982

References

1981 novels